MarinAire is a US company founded in 2007 and based in Miami, Florida (with an international distribution center in Doral, Florida) that manufactures marine air conditioning and HVAC products. The company has presently more than 150 employees working in the production, R&D, logistics, marketing, and IT departments.

After its establishment, the company worked for  years on R&D, launching its MSA product line in 2008 and MSB second generation in 2010. In 2011, MarinAire was awarded the U.S. Commerce Associations’ Award Plaque, an award that recognizes outstanding local businesses throughout the country, as well as those who have achieved outstanding marketing success and enhanced their positive image through service to their customers and community.

References

Companies established in 2007
Heating, ventilation, and air conditioning companies
Manufacturing companies based in Miami